Venceremos is a Spanish and Portuguese word meaning "we will overcome", or "we will win". 

Venceremos may refer to:
 
 Venceremos, a battle cry and the name of a few republican newspapers during the Spanish Civil War 
 Venceremos (newspaper), a daily newspaper published in Guantánamo, Cuba
 Venceremos Brigade, a socialist organization that sends annual work brigades to Cuba
 Venceremos (political organization), a Chicano radical group of the late 1960s and early 1970s in the United States, based in Northern California and unrelated to the Veneceremos Brigade
 Radio Venceremos, an FMLN guerrilla group's radio station during the El Salvador Civil War

Music
 "Venceremos" (song), written by Claudio Iturra and Sergio Ortega for the 1970 election campaign of Salvador Allende
 Venceremos, a 2022 album by Karamelo Santo
 "Venceremos (We Will Win)", a 1984 song by Working Week
 "Venceremos - Wir werden siegen", a 2002 song by Die Toten Hosen from Auswärtsspiel